Pindi Sarhal is a village in the Attock District of Punjab Province in Pakistan. It is located 90 km north west of the country's capital, Islamabad.

Most of the families settled here belong to the Khattar tribe.

References 

Villages in Attock District